The Unholy is a 2021 American supernatural horror film written, produced, and directed by Evan Spiliotopoulos (in his directorial debut), based on the 1983 novel Shrine by James Herbert. Produced by Sam Raimi through his Ghost House Pictures banner, it stars Jeffrey Dean Morgan, Katie Aselton, William Sadler, Diogo Morgado, Cricket Brown, and Cary Elwes. The film follows on a disgraced journalist (Morgan) who discovers a series of seemingly divine miracles in a small New England town and uses them to resurrect his career, though those ‘miracles’ may have a much darker source.

The project was announced in December 2018 under the working title Shrine, with Sony Pictures adapting Herbert's novel of the same name. The cast was announced between 2018 and 2020, with principal photography commencing in Boston, but on March 14, 2020, filming was suspended because of the COVID-19 pandemic.

The Unholy was theatrically released in the United States on April 2, 2021. Despite the film receiving negative reviews from critics, it was a commercial success, grossing over $31 million worldwide against its $10 million budget.

Plot
The film opens in 1845 with the execution of a woman, later identified as Mary Elnor, who has been accused of witchcraft in Banfield, Massachusetts. The woman is hanged from a tree and ultimately set on fire. Before she dies, however, her ash is kept in a kern doll, indicating the doll has been possessed by Mary's spirit.

In the present day, disgraced journalist Gerry Fenn works a job reporting on all things strange and unusual. His latest assignment takes him to Boston, where the purported strange activity is revealed to be a teenage prank. As he is preparing to leave, he discovers the doll and purposely crushes it, accidentally freeing Mary's spirit. Gerry later gets into an accident as he is driving away after seeing a young girl, Alice Pagett, run across the road. He follows Alice to the tree where Mary was hanged, the site where he found the doll, and hears her speak before collapsing. When he takes her to a nearby church, he learns that Alice is deaf and mute. Gerry decides to stay in town to investigate what he thinks could be a real story of the supernatural.

The following day, Alice stuns the community by speaking, proclaiming that she has been cured by the Virgin Mary. This launches a media furore that is further propelled by other seemingly miraculous healings. During one of the healings, a statue of the Virgin Mary near the chancel of the church cries tears of blood. The Catholic Church sends Monsignor Delgarde to investigate the claims, assisted by Bishop Gyles. Gerry befriends Alice, who tells him that while she has been speaking to an entity named Mary, she has only assumed that it was the Virgin Mary. Beginning to suspect that something sinister is occurring due to visions of "Mary" as a horrific creature, Gerry finds a partner in Father William Hagan, Alice's maternal uncle, whom she healed, but also suspects the healings' true nature. Hagan discovers a book detailing Mary Elnor, who performed miracles for Satan, but before he has the chance to warn anybody Elnor attacks him and his body is found hanging in the church. Gyles convinces Gerry to keep the apparent suicide of Hagan quiet as it will tarnish the divine occurrences; Hagan's death is declared an accident.

Gerry befriends Natalie Gates, the town's physician, and reveals that he was found fabricating stories which is why he now reports hoax stories, hoping this event will relaunch his career. The pair eventually comes across the information Hagan discovered, revealing Elnor sold her soul to Satan in order to gain power. Satan would allow her and her descendants (one of whom being Alice) to perform "miracles" prompting people to pledge themselves to her, and in turn, Satan. Elnor tries to kill Gerry, but Delgarde drives her away with prayer and a crucifix. Gerry and Delgarde are shocked to learn that Gyles was aware of the history in Banfield involving Elnor, but thought that it was not connected to the miracles that were recently occurring. He warns Gerry that any attempt to share his views on the situation will fall on deaf ears due to Gerry’s tarnished reputation.

Alice, who they believe is unaware of Mary's true nature, wishes to hold a church service by the tree and broadcast it to the masses. Delgarde warns that those pledging themselves to Elnor would make her stronger and condemn their soul to Hell. Gerry, Natalie and Delgarde try to perform a ritual in the church to stop this, but Elnor appears and crushes Delgarde with a burning cross.

Once the service begins, Alice urges everyone to pledge themselves to Mary three times. Gerry manages to stop the crowd from fully pledging by claiming that the miracles were just more of his hoaxes, that they were all a result of the placebo effect. Natalie communicates with Alice using sign language, urging her to stop the service. Mary speaks to Alice, entreating her to continue it or never speak again. Realizing Mary's true nature, Alice confirms that the miracles were not of God. The tree suddenly bursts into flames, causing all the attendants to flee in panic as an angry Mary emerges from it. She incinerates Gyles before attempting to kill Gerry, but Alice sacrifices herself to save his life. This causes Mary to disappear, as Alice was her link to the living world. Struck by her sacrifice, Gerry begs God to save Alice's life. She comes back to life, but is once again deaf. All the people whom Alice cured soon return to their prior state and the film concludes with a warning from Biblical verse Matthew 7:15.

Cast
 Jeffrey Dean Morgan as Gerald "Gerry" Fenn
 Cricket Brown as Alice Pagett
 William Sadler as Father William Hagan
 Katie Aselton as Natalie Gates
 Cary Elwes as Bishop Gyles
 Diogo Morgado as Monsignor Delgarde
 Bates Wilder as Geary
 Marina Mazepa as Mary Elnor
 Christine Adams as Monica Slade
 Gisela Chipe as Sofia Walsh
 Dustin Tucker as Dan Walsh
 Danny and Sonny Corbo as Toby Walsh

Production
On December 3, 2018, Deadline reported that Screen Gems and Sam Raimi would produce Shrine, a film adaptation of James Herbert's horror novel of the same name, with Evan Spiliotopoulos writing the script and making his directorial debut. On September 18, 2019, Jeffrey Dean Morgan was cast in the film. On November 12, 2019, Jordana Brewster joined the cast of the film. On February 27, 2020, Katie Aselton, William Sadler, Diogo Morgado, Cricket Brown, Marina Mazepa, Christine Adams, Bates Wilder and Cary Elwes joined the cast of the film, with Aselton replacing Brewster.

Principal photography commenced in Boston that same week, but on March 14, 2020, filming was suspended because of the COVID-19 pandemic. When filming resumed, due to CDC guidelines there could be no more than 10 background actors on set together at once, forcing Spiliotopoulos to use "the same people in five different places".

Release
In March 2021, the film's new title was announced as The Unholy, along with a trailer and a scheduled release date of April 2, 2021. The film release digitally on May 25, 2021 and on Blu-ray, DVD and Ultra HD Blu-ray on June 22, 2021.

Reception

Box office 
The Unholy grossed $15.6 million in the United States and Canada and $15.4 million in other territories for a worldwide total of $31 million.

The Unholy grossed $1.2 million on its first day and a total of $3.2 million from 1,850 theaters its opening weekend, finishing second at the box office behind fellow newcomer Godzilla vs. Kong. The film dropped 23% to $2.4 million in its second weekend, then made $2 million in its third.

Critical response 
Review aggregator Rotten Tomatoes reports that 27% of 60 critics gave the film a positive review and an average rating of 4.90/10. The website's critics consensus reads: "Rarely scary and often dull, The Unholy falls back on the same tired tropes that have already been done to death by countless other religious horror movies." Metacritic assigned a weighted average score of 36 out of 100 based on 15 critics, indicating "generally unfavorable reviews". Audiences polled by CinemaScore gave the film an average grade of "C+" on an A+ to F scale, while PostTrak reported 52% of audience members gave it a positive score, with 37% saying they would definitely recommend it.

Alonso Duralde of the TheWrap said that "you've seen this one before, countless times" and wrote: "Sam Raimi is a producer here, and it's hard not to think about how he might have mined this material both for provocation and for fright; his Drag Me to Hell remains the gold standard of how to scare the heck out of an audience within the restrictions of PG-13. What we get instead here is a tepid little chiller with an overqualified cast."

Movieguide, which reviews films from a Christian perspective, opined that The Unholy is a "well-made, captivating horror movie with a strong Christian worldview. It’s clear early on that the Christian characters recognize the tension between good and evil".

The film was met with controversy from Catholics almost immediately once the promotional cycle started. Michigan based Reverend Gordon Reigle said of the concept “Mary is the mother of Jesus Christ and, therefore, the spiritual mother to all Christians. Does anyone enjoy seeing their mother mocked or offended? I don’t think so”

See also 
Exorcism in Christianity

References

External links
 
 

2021 directorial debut films
2021 horror films
2020s English-language films
2020s ghost films
2020s supernatural horror films
American ghost films
American supernatural horror films
Anti-Catholicism
Film productions suspended due to the COVID-19 pandemic
Films about witchcraft
Films based on British horror novels
Films produced by Sam Raimi
Films scored by Joseph Bishara
Films set in Boston
Films shot in Boston
Films with screenplays by Evan Spiliotopoulos
Ghost House Pictures films
Religious controversies in film
Religious horror films
Obscenity controversies in film
Screen Gems films
The Devil in film
2020s American films